USS T-1 has been the name of more than one United States Navy ship, and may refer to:

 , later SF-1, a fleet submarine in commission from 1920 to 1922
 USS T-1 (SST-1, ex-AGSS-570), a training submarine in commission from 1953 to 1973, renamed  in 1956

United States Navy ship names